Botched by Nature is an American reality television spin-off series based on the plastic surgery-related series Botched that premiered on the E! cable network on August 9, 2016. Announced in October 2015, the eight-part series features Botched doctors Terry Dubrow and Paul Nassif who travel around the country and try to help people that were "botched by genetics or a traumatic incident".

Episodes

Broadcast
Internationally, the series started airing in Australia and New Zealand on the local version of E! on August 11, 2016.

References

External links 

 
 

2010s American reality television series
2016 American television series debuts
2016 American television series endings
American television spin-offs
English-language television shows
E! original programming
Makeover reality television series
Television series about plastic surgery
Reality television spin-offs